Bathytoma somalica is a species of sea snail, a marine gastropod mollusk in the family Borsoniidae.

Distribution
This marine species occurs in the Indian Ocean off Somalia and Mozambique.

Description

References

 Ardovini R. (2015). A new variety and a new species of Bathytoma (Gastropoda: Conoidea) from Somalia and Mozambico Channel. Malacologia Mostra Mondiale. 86: 6-8.

External links
 Gastropods.com: Bathytoma solomonensis

somalica